A promoter works with event production and entertainment industries to promote their productions, including in music and sports. Promoters are individuals or organizations engaged in the business of marketing and promoting live, or pay-per-view and similar, events, such as music concerts, gigs, nightclub performances and raves; sports events; and festivals.

Description

Business model 
Promoters are typically engaged as independent contractors or representative companies by entertainment venues, earning a pre-arranged fee, or a share of revenues (colloquially known as a "cut" and "share of the house"), or both. A share of revenues is often a simple percentage of admission fees (called "the door") and/or food and drink sales, with many variations possible, such as minimums or maximums, allowances for various expenses, or limitations (such as only alcohol sales after midnight). Other promoters operate independently, renting venues for a fixed fee, or under a revenue sharing arrangement with the venue holder, thus keeping larger profits from successful events. One common arrangement for small venues is for the promoter to earn all of the admissions fees, while the venue retains all food and drink revenue.

Some venues have exclusive arrangements with a single promotion company, others work with multiple promoters on a rotating schedule (one night per week, for example), or on an event-by-event basis. Promoters often work together — either as equal partners, or as subcontractors to each other's events. Several promoters may work together for a special event, such as a large New Year's Eve party in a hotel ballroom. They may also engage freelance hosts for their social influence; these amateur promoters market the events to their circle of friends and/or social media followers, in exchange for special treatment and/or free admission to the event and at times, and may form or be included in street teams that promote events at other live venues.

Minimally, an event promoter manages publicity and advertising. Depending on the arrangement, they may also handle security, ticket sales, event admission (door policies), decorations, and booking of other entertainers. Many promoters are DJs or musicians themselves, and may perform at their own events. Some bloggers and individuals with a large following on social media may consider themselves as promoters and charge fees promotional service via their social media platform(s), or through their efforts.

Many musicians and artists act as de facto promoters for their own concerts, either directly or through their manager or booking company. Historically, promotion has been a cottage industry, with companies operated by one or several well-connected charismatic individuals, often working part-time.  However, with the rise of corporate ownership of live entertainment assets, several large companies have emerged in the field.

Contracts and disputes 
There are often disputes over money in the promotions industry because it is largely cash business with a history of corruption and uneven recordkeeping.  In addition there are many accounting complexities to manage, particularly for large events: revenue, expenses, and  oversight of parking, coat checks, concession vendor sales (e.g., CDs and t-shirts), box office so-called "convenience fees", in kind trades, promotional give-away items used to lure guests (e.g., free drinks), costs for insurance, cleaning staff, and so on. One area of frequent contention are quid pro quo cross-promotions, where the promoter or some other party connected with the venue will obtain a favor (for example, a price discount) in exchange for giving a future favor to the vendor. If the existence of the scheme, or the relationship between the parties, is undisclosed this may become a form of bribery.  Another opportunity for misunderstanding are the various "lists" of guests who will be admitted for free or with VIP treatment, and the "door policy" used by bouncers to decide who will be admitted and at what price. To deal with these complexities event contracts can become quite long and detailed.  Whether written or not, these arrangements tend to favor the party with the greater sophistication or the more control over the production of the event. Even the most detailed, professionally written and negotiated contracts can become the subject of lawsuits over interpretation.

Because nightclubs are often associated with drug and alcohol consumption, rowdiness, and other late-night behavior, promoters may become entangled in various criminal disputes as well.

Methods 
Promoters bring crowds through a variety of methods.  The most direct are guerrilla marketing techniques such as plastering posters on outdoor walls, flyposting, and distributing handbills on windows of cars parked in entertainment districts. Promoters also keep mailing lists, usually email lists, of their preferred guests and their wider list of potential customers. Many promoters have taken advantage of online technology such as social networking services and event listing sites to handle publicity, invitations, mailing lists, and so on. Clubs and promoters are among leaders in SMS text message advertising to their own lists as well as sponsored snippets on third-party lists for daily content to subscribers. Many fans promote events, products through their Facebook/Twitter/Myspace on their own free will.

Promoters often build a brand out of their own personalities and the parties they host, marketing the events under a consistent name, style, type of program, and social experience that downplays the branding of the venue or artist.  They may develop a loyal clientele that will follow them from one location to another.

Image promotion and VIP hosting 

In cosmopolitan cities with large affluent populations, there are upscale venues that employ the services of a special kind of promoter called an image promoter.  The role of the image promoter is to bring celebrities or fashion models to high end venues and host them at a VIP table.  In order to entice models and celebrities to come to the venue, the image promoter is provided with a VIP table and complementary alcohol.  High end venues use the presence of models and celebrities to market their venue to an affluent clientele which may often only obtain admittance to the venue through agreeing to spend a certain amount of money on alcohol at the establishment.

Notable promoters

Music and other events 
 Michael Alig, co-founder of Club Kids
 Johnny Edgecombe, London Jazz promoter
 Shelly Finkel, concert promoter (LiveStyle)
 Bill Graham, concert promoter (Bill Graham Presents)
 Al Haymon, A. H. Enterprises (now a subsidiary of Live Nation)
 Chet Helms, concert promoter, (Big Brother and the Holding Company, Family Dog Productions)
 Dick Klotzman, concert promoter
 Paul Tangi Mhova Mkondo International African Music Promoter.
 Kirk Norcross, nightclub promoter (Sugar Hut)
 Philip Sallon, known for the Mud Club, Blitz Club.
 James St. James, co-founder of Club Kids
 Brandon Ward, event promoter (AYA Entertainment)
 Kieran Rushton, event promoter (DOTWAVNOTWAVE)

Sports

Basketball 
 Gary Davidson, ABA co-founder
 Ned Irish, president, New York Knicks, 1946 to 1974
 Dennis Murphy, ABA co-founder
 Abe Saperstein, founder, Harlem Globetrotters

Boxing and mixed martial arts (MMA)
 Muhammad Ali, boxing promoter (Main Bout, Inc. – New York)
 Bob Arum, boxing promoter (Top Rank; Main Bout, Inc.)
 Jarvis Astaire, boxing promoter (First Artist Corp, Sport Division — London, UK)
 Frankie Carbo, Mafia member and boxing promoter ("The Combination" — New York City)
 Bill Cayton, boxing promoter and film producer (Big Fights, Inc. – New York)
 Jack Curley, 19th century boxing promoter turned wrestling promoter
 Oscar De La Hoya, boxing and MMA promoter (Golden Boy Promotions)
 Dan Duva, boxing promoter (Main Events – New Jersey)
 Dino Duva, boxing promoter (Main Events – New Jersey)
 Lou Duva, boxing promoter (Main Events – New Jersey)
 Kathy Duva, boxing promoter (Main Events – New Jersey)
 Shelly Finkel, boxing promoter (Empire Sports and Entertainment, Inc., Shelly Finkel Management, Inc. – New York)
 Al Haymon, boxing promoter and adviser (Premier Boxing Champions)
 Scott Coker, MMA promoter (Bellator MMA; Strikeforce)
 Barry Hearn, boxing promoter (Matchroom Sport)
 Eddie Hearn, boxing promoter (Matchroom Sport)
 Dave Higgins, boxing promoter (Duco Events) 
 Jack "Doc" Kearns, boxing manager and promoter
 Don King, boxing promoter (Don King Productions)
 Kellie Maloney, boxing promoter (Frank Maloney Promotions & Management Limited)
Victor Cui, MMA and Kickboxing promoter (ONE Championship)
Chatri Sityodtong, MMA and Kickboxing promoter (ONE Championship)
 Sammie Marshall, boxing promoter, embezzler (MAPS)
 Floyd Mayweather Jr., boxing promoter (Mayweather Promotions)
 Manny Pacquiao, boxing promoter (MP Promotions)
 Harold J. Smith, boxing promoter, embezzler (MAPS)
 Mike Tyson, boxing promoter (Acquinity Sports)
 Frank Warren, boxing promoter (Queensberry Promotions Limited – London, UK)
 Dana White, MMA and boxing promoter (Ultimate Fighting Championship)
 Khabib Nurmagomedov, MMA promoter (Eagle Fighting Championship)
 Shamil Zavurov, MMA promoter (Eagle Fighting Championship)
 Mario Yagobi, boxing promoter (Boxing360 - New York City)
 Felix "Tuto" Zabala, boxing promoter (Miami)
 Chael Sonnen, grappling promoter (Submission Underground (sug))
 Chael Sonnen, wrestling promoter (Chael Sonnen's Wrestling Underground)

Football 
 Gary Davidson, World Football League founder

Hockey 
 Gary Davidson, WHA co-founder
 Dennis Murphy, WHA co-founder
 Conn Smythe, namesake of the Conn Smythe Trophy

Tennis 
 Leonard Bloom, World Team Tennis co-founder
 Nancy Jeffett, women's tennis promoter
 Billie Jean King, Women's Tennis Association founder, World Team Tennis co-founder 
 Larry King, World Team Tennis co-founder
 Dennis Murphy, World Team Tennis co-founder

Wrestling 
 Antonio Inoki, New Japan Pro-Wrestling
 Antonio Peña, Lucha Libre AAA Worldwide
 Atsushi Onita, Frontier Martial-Arts Wrestling
 Billy Sandow, Gold Dust Trio
 Billy Wolfe, women's wrestling promoter and manager
 Dixie Carter, Total Nonstop Action Wrestling
 Ed "Strangler" Lewis, Gold Dust Trio
 Eric Bischoff, World Championship Wrestling
 Fred Kohler,  Fred Kohler Enterprises; Wrestling From Marigold, 1949 to 1955; president, National Wrestling Alliance, 1961 to 1962.
 Jack Curley, sports promoter who helped popularize professional wrestling
 Jack Pfefer, entertainment wrestling pioneer
 Jim Cornette, Smoky Mountain Wrestling
 Leroy McGuirk, National Wrestling Alliance
 Max Crabtree, Joint Promotions
 Mike Quackenbush, CHIKARA
 Mildred Burke, World Wide Women's Wrestling Association founder; wrestler
 Paul Bowser, early wrestling promoter; world middleweight champion
 Paul Heyman, Extreme Championship Wrestling
 Stu Hart, Stampede Wrestling
 Tony Khan, All Elite Wrestling
 Joseph "Toots" Mondt, Gold Dust Trio
 Verne Gagne, American Wrestling Association
 Vince McMahon, World Wrestling Entertainment

Miscellaneous 
 Wilt Chamberlain, volleyball and track and field
 Larry King, Roller Hockey International co-founder
 Dennis Murphy, Roller Hockey International co-founder
 Giorgio A. Tsoukalos, former bodybuilding promoter (IFBB, Mr. Olympia)

See also 
 Impresario
 List of professional wrestling promoters in the United States

Notes

References 
Myler, Patrick (1997). A Century of Boxing Greats: Inside the Ring with the Hundred Best Boxers. Robson Books (UK) / Parkwest Publications (US). .

Business terms
Event management
Music industry
Entertainment occupations

Boxing terminology
Kickboxing terminology